Seyyed Mahalleh (also Romanized as Seyyed Maḩalleh) is a village in Langarud Rural District, Salman Shahr District, Abbasabad County, Mazandaran Province, Iran. At the 2006 census, its population was 782, in 224 families.

References 

Populated places in Abbasabad County